Platypus Ridge is a large ice-covered ridge bordering the west side of the mouth of Lillie Glacier. It extends northeast from Bowers Mountains to the head of Ob' Bay. Its position was fixed by S.L. Kirkby, surveyor with ANARE (Australian National Antarctic Research Expeditions) (Thala Dan) in February 1962. Named by ANARE after this monotreme mammal, native only to Australia.

Ridges of Victoria Land
Pennell Coast